The Nokia 215 is a Nokia-branded dual-band GSM feature phone by Microsoft Mobile. The phone is available in black, white, and bright green.

Specifications
The Nokia 215 has a VGA camera, speakerphone, multimedia playback, MMS messaging, web browser and e-mail client. It also has pre-loaded Facebook and Twitter apps, as well as the Opera Mini web browser, and also features Microsoft services such as built in Bing and MSN Weather.

The phone can download other apps and games using the pre-installed mobile apps store.

Battery talk time is up to 20 hours and standby time is 29 days. Its dimensions are 116 x 50 x 12.9 mm, and it uses 2G network infrastructure, and is activated through a mini-SIM. The phone allows up to 1000 contacts to be stored in its address book.

The Nokia 215 was released to consumers in the first quarter of 2015 in the Middle East, Africa, Asia, and Europe.

See also 
 Nokia 3-digit series
 Nokia 130
 Nokia 220

References

External links 
 Specifications (Microsoft Mobile Oy)

215
Nokia 215
Mobile phones introduced in 2015
Mobile phones with user-replaceable battery